Living Alone may refer to:

 Reclusiveness, living alone in social isolation
 Singleton (lifestyle), a household with one person, without the connotation of social isolation
 "Living Alone" (song), a song by John Mayall & the Bluesbreakers from the album A Hard Road
 Living Alone (EP), by Teddy Geiger